Matthew Herbert (c. 1563 – 1611), of Dolguog, Machynlleth, Montgomeryshire, was a Welsh politician.

He was a Member (MP) of the Parliament of England for Montgomery Boroughs in 1586. He was a justice of the peace for Montgomeryshire  from c. 1594 and Merionethshire from c. 1596. He was Sheriff of Merionethshire in 1598–99 and again in 1609–10.

Notes

References

1560s births
1611 deaths
16th-century Welsh politicians
People from Montgomeryshire
Members of the Parliament of England (pre-1707) for constituencies in Wales
English MPs 1586–1587